The 1972 NCAA University Division Wrestling Championships were the 42nd NCAA University Division Wrestling Championships to be held. The University of Maryland in College Park, Maryland hosted the tournament at Cole Field House.

Iowa State took home the team championship with 103 points and three individual champions. 

Wade Schalles of Clarion was named the Most Outstanding Wrestler and John Panning of Minnesota received the Gorriaran Award.

Team results

Individual finals

References
1972 NCAA Tournament Results

NCAA Division I Wrestling Championship
NCAA
Wrestling competitions in the United States
NCAA University Division Wrestling Championships
NCAA University Division Wrestling Championships
NCAA University Division Wrestling Championships